{{DISPLAYTITLE:C15H12O2}}
The molecular formula C15H12O2 may refer to:

 Dibenzoylmethane
 α-Phenylcinnamic acid